Orlando Jorge may refer to:

Orlando Jorge Mera (1966–2022), Dominican Republic minister
Orlando Jorge Villegas (born 1991), Dominican Republic legislator